There are approximately 1,600 properties and districts listed on the National Register of Historic Places in the U.S. State of Maine. Each of the state's 16 counties has more than forty listings on the National Register.

Current listings by county
The following are approximate tallies of current listings by county. These counts are based on entries in the National Register Information Database as of April 24, 2008 and new weekly listings posted since then on the National Register of Historic Places web site. There are frequent additions to the listings and occasional delistings and the counts here are approximate and not official.  New entries are added to the official Register on a weekly basis.  Also, the counts in this table exclude boundary increase and decrease listings which only modify the area covered by an existing property or district, although carrying a separate National Register reference number.

See also

List of National Historic Landmarks in Maine
List of bridges on the National Register of Historic Places in Maine

References

 
Maine